Beautiful is an album by Cuban jazz percussionist Candido Camero recorded in 1970 and released on the Blue Note label.

Reception
The Allmusic review by Matt Collar awarded the album 3 stars stating "Beautiful isn't the most essential of Candido's recordings, but should hold a fascination for funk-jazz enthusiasts".

Track listing
All compositions by Joe Cain and Candido Camero except as indicated
 "I'm on My Way" (Richie Havens) - 3:11
 "Tic Tac Toe" (Steve Cropper, Donald "Duck" Dunn, Al Jackson, Jr., Booker T. Jones) - 4:03
 "Hey, Western Union Man" (Jerry Butler, Kenny Gamble, Leon Huff) - 3:29
 "Serenade to a Savage" (Joe Garland) - 4:36
 "New World in the Morning" (Roger Whittaker) - 3:28
 "Beautiful" - 2:54
 "I Shouldn't Believe" (Kelly Montgomery) - 3:26
 "Money Man" - 5:07
 "Ghana Spice, Pt. 1" - 3:06
 "Ghana Spice, Pt. 2" - 4:22
Recorded at A&R Studios in New York City on October 20 (tracks 1-3 & 5) and October 27 (tracks 4 & 6-10), 1970.

Personnel
Candido Camero - conga, bongos
Bernie Glow, Pat Russo - trumpet (tracks 1-3 & 5-10)
Alan Raph - trombone, bass trombone (tracks 1-3 & 5-10)
Joe Grimm - soprano saxophone, baritone saxophone (tracks 1-3 & 5-10)
Frank Anderson - piano, organ 
David Spinozza - guitar
Jerry Jemmott (tracks 1-3 & 5), Richard Davis - electric bass
Herbie Lovelle - drums
Joe Cain - arranger

References

Blue Note Records albums
Candido Camero albums
1970 albums